Sarat Nayak is a music composer and singer in Ollywood for the state Odisha in India.

Life and career
Sarat Nayak was born in Pattamundai. He has completed Post Graduation in Oriya from Utkal University(Vanivihar), Bhubaneswar. He has composed music for different modern albums and has earned name and fame in Ollywood. He is well known among Oriyas for his devotional songs (Oriya Bhajans) and also popular for his bhajans like "Sabu Mayare Baya" and "He Narayan".

Filmography (as music director)
 Chakaa Chakaa Bhaunri
 Bande Utkala Janani
 Shatru Sanghara
 Aa Janhare Lekhiba Naa
 Bad Girl

Selected modern albums
 Aau Ketedina
 Chakori Jharana Luha
 Mana Rahena
 Sasura Ghara Jindabad
 Janha Raati
 Smruti
 Jibanare Thare Adhe
 E Goura

Selected Bhajan albums
 Bada Dian
 Sabu Mayare Baaya
 He Narayana
 Bhaba Jamuna
 Jai Shreeram
 Papa Punya
 Tuma Pade Sarana

External links
Sarat Nayak-OdiaMusic
Sarat Nayak-Gaana.com
Sarat Nayak-facebook
Sarat Nayak-MusicOnline

Living people
People from Kendrapara district
Ollywood
Indian male playback singers
Indian male composers
Year of birth missing (living people)